Clinton Thomas Crowe (born June 12, 1973) is an American politician from Georgia. Crowe is a Republican member of Georgia House of Representatives for District 110, which covers a part of Henry County.

Personal life 
Crowe's wife is Kristie Crowe. They have four children. Crowe and his family live in Jackson Lake, Georgia.

References

External links 
 Clint Crowe at ballotpedia.org

Republican Party members of the Georgia House of Representatives
21st-century American politicians
Living people
1973 births